The U.S. Post Office in La Junta, Colorado, at 4th and Colorado Ave., was built in 1915.  It was listed on the National Register of Historic Places in 1976.

Its design is credited to Oscar Wenderoth.  It is a two-story building, built in "a modified Spanish Colonial style".

References

External links

Post office buildings in Colorado
National Register of Historic Places in Otero County, Colorado
Mission Revival architecture in Colorado
Buildings and structures completed in 1915